In Pakistani parliamentary practice, the leader of the House for the Senate of Pakistan is a party office held by a member of the governing party in the Senate of Pakistan. The leader is elected by the government parties and leads the government side in the Pakistan Senate (whether or not that party held a majority in the Senate).

The leader of the House refers to the prime minister or a member appointed by him to represent government and regulate government business in the Senate. The leader of the House represents the treasury benches, when the prime minister is not present in the house usually as the leader serves more time towards the National Assembly of Pakistan. The current leader is Ishaq Dar.

List of the leaders for the Senate of Pakistan

References

Senate of Pakistan